The LGBT Caucus of the Chicago City Council is a bloc of aldermen in the Chicago City Council that was formed in 2015, to focus on issues affecting the lesbian, gay, bisexual, and transgender communities. As of 2022, the caucus consists of 6 members, out of the council's 50 aldermen.

History 
The caucus was formed by five openly gay or lesbian aldermen in June 2015. Upon its formation, the caucus' legislative priorities included "HIV care and prevention, homelessness, violence and workplace discrimination against transgender people."

Membership

Current members 
The following table lists current aldermen who are members of the LGBT Caucus, as of May 2019.

Past members

See also 
 Chicago Aldermanic Black Caucus
 Chicago City Council Democratic Socialist Caucus
 Chicago City Council Latino Caucus
 Chicago City Council Progressive Reform Caucus

References 

LGBT caucuses
 
American LGBT city council members
 
LGBT
LGBT culture in Chicago